Dhok Tapialian is a town in the Islamabad Capital Territory of Pakistan. It is located at 33° 29' 15N 73° 23' 5E with an altitude of 578 metres (1899 feet).

References 

Union councils of Islamabad Capital Territory